Joseph Edward Lauzon Jr. (born May 22, 1984) is an American professional mixed martial artist, competing in the UFC's Lightweight division. A well-rounded fighter, he has the fourth most post-fight bonus awards in UFC history, behind Donald Cerrone, Charles Oliveira and Nate Diaz. Joe's younger brother, Dan Lauzon, is also a mixed martial artist.

Background
Joseph Edward Lauzon Jr. was born on May 22, 1984, in Brockton, Massachusetts. He lived there until he was in the third grade, when he moved to East Bridgewater. Lauzon lived on a small farm and enjoyed riding horses. The young Lauzon and his friends had an interest in professional wrestling, and would re-enact moves on Lauzon's trampoline. Lauzon did not begin training in the martial arts until his junior year at East Bridgewater High School, after seeing a demonstration that piqued his interest. Lauzon graduated from Wentworth Institute of Technology in 2007 with a Bachelor's degree in computer science. He worked as a network administrator in Cambridge, Massachusetts before he began training in mixed martial arts full-time.

Mixed martial arts career

Early career
Lauzon's first amateur fight was in 2002. He held a 5–3 record as an amateur.

In 2004, Lauzon had his first cage fight, winning with a first round armbar in a local Massachusetts promotion, Mass Destruction. Lauzon then went on an eight fight winning streak with all the fights ended via submission. Lauzon won an eight-man tournament, defeating three fighters in one night in the World Fighting League and was crowned the WFL Grand Prix Champion. Lauzon was also named 2004 Massachusetts fighter of the year by local Massachusetts MMA outlets.

Lauzon made his debut in the UFC upsetting former UFC Lightweight Champion Jens Pulver at UFC 63 on September 23, 2006, winning via KO in 48 seconds and in doing so, beat 7-to-1 odds. He was awarded a Knockout of the Night award.

Lauzon has been sponsored throughout his career by independent record label Massachusetts-based Deathwish Inc.

The Ultimate Fighter
Lauzon was a contestant on The Ultimate Fighter 5, which featured lightweights exclusively. He was on B.J. Penn's team, against a team coached by Jens Pulver. Lauzon defeated Brian Geraghty in the preliminary round. He then defeated Cole Miller in the quarterfinals. The win was somewhat controversial due to an illegal strike to the back of Miller's head. Miller appeared obviously dazed by the illegal strike and was given time to recover. However, when action was restarted, it was clear that Cole was still feeling the effects of the strike. Lauzon capitalized on it and won the fight. In the semi-finals, Lauzon lost a unanimous decision to Manvel Gamburyan. At the finale, he defeated Brandon Melendez via submission (triangle choke) at 2:09 of round two.

Ultimate Fighting Championship
At UFC 78 Lauzon submitted previously undefeated Jason Reinhardt by rear-naked choke in the first round. Lauzon quickly took Reinhardt down before moving to the north-south position. Reinhardt rolled, giving Lauzon his back, and Lauzon quickly sunk in the rear-naked choke for a quick submission victory.

On April 2, 2008, Kenny Florian defeated Lauzon in the main event of UFC Fight Night 13 by TKO via strikes from mount in the second round. The first round was back and forth as Florian opened up a cut on Lauzon's head with elbows and took his back while Lauzon landed several takedowns and attempted several submissions. Florian opened the second round with a takedown and soon advanced to mount where he landed multiple unanswered strikes until the fight was waved off.

Lauzon defeated Kyle Bradley by technical knockout in round two at UFC Fight Night 15 on September 17, 2008. In the first round Bradley connected with a punch and rocked Lauzon. Lauzon managed to recover and continued to trade with Bradley in a close first round. In the second round Lauzon scored a takedown and transitioned quickly into mount before taking Bradley's back. Lauzon landed several punches from this position until the referee stepped in to save Bradley.

Lauzon was scheduled to fight former WEC Lightweight Champion, Hermes Franca on February 7, 2009, in the main event for UFC Fight Night 17. However, Franca pulled out of the event with a torn anterior cruciate ligament in his right knee. Jeremy Stephens stepped in as a late replacement. Lauzon defeated Stephens by armbar in the second round, which earned him a Submission of the Night bonus award.

Lauzon fought Sam Stout on January 2, 2010, at UFC 108 and lost in a very entertaining fight by decision, which also won Fight of the Night bonus award.

Lauzon was expected to face Terry Etim on August 28, 2010, at UFC 118, but Etim had to withdraw from the bout due to injury. Lauzon was instead set to fight fellow Ultimate Fighter season 5 castmate Gabe Ruediger. During the UFC 118 weigh-ins Ruediger brought Lauzon a cake that read "Sorry for your loss". Lauzon defeated Ruediger, who is a black belt in Brazilian jiu-jitsu, via armbar in 2:01 of round one having completely dominated him for the entire fight. The submission earned him a Submission of the Night award. According to commentator Joe Rogan, Gabe "was never in it for a second."

Lauzon faced George Sotiropoulos on November 20, 2010, at UFC 123. The fight began with an action-packed first round, that saw Lauzon set the pace.  However, by the end of the round, Lauzon began to tire and saw Sotiropoulos began to gain momentum.  The second round saw a fatigued and passive Joe Lauzon.  After a scramble, Sotiropoulous ended up on top position and torqued a kimura to force the tap-out. Both fighters earned a Fight of the Night bonus award.

Lauzon faced Curt Warburton on June 26 at UFC on Versus 4. Lauzon defeated Warburton via first round kimura, which earned him a Submission of the Night bonus award.

Lauzon was briefly linked to a bout with Charles Oliveira on November 19, 2011 at UFC 138.  However, Oliveira instead faced Donald Cerrone on August 14, 2011 at UFC Live: Hardy vs. Lytle, replacing an injured Paul Taylor.

Lauzon defeated Melvin Guillard on October 8, 2011 by rear-naked choke at UFC 136, earning his fourth Submission of the Night honor and sixth straight UFC Bonus award.

Lauzon faced Anthony Pettis on February 26, 2012 at UFC 144 He lost the fight by KO due to a head kick in 91 seconds.

Lauzon was again expected to face Terry Etim on August 4, 2012 at UFC on Fox 4. However, Etim was forced out of the bout with an injury and replaced by Jamie Varner. In a back-and-forth fight that saw both men rocked, Lauzon secured the victory after locking in a triangle choke on Varner at 2:44 of the third round. His performance earned him the Fight of the Night and Submission of the Night honors and a Fight of the Year nomination at the World MMA Awards.

Lauzon was expected to face Gray Maynard on December 29, 2012 at UFC 155.  However, Maynard pulled out of the bout citing a knee injury and was replaced by Jim Miller.  Miller defeated Lauzon via unanimous decision.  The back and forth action earned both participants Fight of the Night honors.

Lauzon faced Michael Johnson on August 17, 2013 at UFC Fight Night 26. He was defeated by unanimous decision, after being outmatched by Johnson.

Lauzon faced Mac Danzig on December 14, 2013 at UFC on Fox 9. He won the fight via unanimous decision.

Lauzon faced Michael Chiesa on September 5, 2014 at UFC Fight Night 50.  After a back and forth fight, Lauzon defeated Chiesa via TKO in the second round after opening a significant cut above Chiesa's right eye, forcing a doctor's stoppage.  The performance earned both participants Fight of the Night honors.

Lauzon was expected to face Diego Sanchez on November 15, 2014 at UFC 180, replacing an injured Norman Parke.  However, on October 23, it was announced that injuries to both Sanchez and Lauzon led to the pairing being scrapped altogether.

Lauzon next faced Al Iaquinta on January 31, 2015 at UFC 183. Lauzon lost the fight via TKO in the second round.

As the first bout of his new eight-fight contract, Lauzon faced Takanori Gomi on July 25, 2015 at UFC on Fox 16. After successfully taking Gomi down, he won the fight via TKO in the first round.

Lauzon faced Evan Dunham on December 11, 2015 at The Ultimate Fighter 22 Finale. He lost the fight by unanimous decision.

Lauzon faced Diego Sanchez on July 9, 2016 at UFC 200. He won the fight via TKO in the first round, becoming the first man to finish Sanchez by strikes. The win earned him his first Performance of the Night bonus award.

After sustaining virtually no damage during his previous fight, Lauzon was quickly rescheduled to rematch Jim Miller on August 27, 2016 at UFC on Fox 21. Lauzon lost the rematch by split decision. Both participants were awarded a Fight of the Night bonus.

Lauzon next faced Marcin Held on January 15, 2017 at UFC Fight Night 103. He was awarded a controversial split decision victory, even stating he felt he lost the bout post-fight. Likewise, 16 out of 17 media pundits scored the bout for Held; the lone holdout scored the fight a draw.

Lauzon next faced Stevie Ray on April 22, 2017 at UFC Fight Night 108. Lauzon lost the bout by a majority decision.

Lauzon faced Clay Guida on November 11, 2017 at UFC Fight Night 120. He lost the fight via technical knockout in round one.

As the first bout of his new four-fight contract, Lauzon faced Chris Gruetzemacher on April 7, 2018 at UFC 223. He lost this fight after his corner stopped the fight after the second round.

After an 18 month hiatus, Lauzon faced Jonathan Pearce on October 18, 2019 at UFC on ESPN 6. He won the fight via technical knockout in round one.

After another 31 month hiatus, Lauzon was scheduled to face Donald Cerrone on April 30, 2022 at UFC Fight Night 208. The bout was moved to May 7, 2022 at UFC 274 for undisclosed reasons. Despite both competitors weighing in, the bout was cancelled the day of the event due to Cerrone falling ill. The pair was rescheduled to meet at UFC on ESPN 37 on June 18, 2022. The bout was yet again scrapped the day of this event due to Lauzon suffering from leg cramping.

Championships and accomplishments
Ultimate Fighting Championship
Fight of the Night Honors (seven times) vs. Kenny Florian, Sam Stout, George Sotiropoulos, Jamie Varner, Jim Miller (2), & Michael Chiesa
Knockout of the Night Honors (one time) vs. Jens Pulver
Submission of the Night Honors (six times) vs. Brandon Melendez, Jeremy Stephens, Gabe Ruediger, Curt Warburton, Melvin Guillard, & Jamie Varner
Performance of the Night Honors (one time) vs. Diego Sanchez
Fourth most post-fight bonus awards in UFC history (15)
Most Submission of the Night Honors in UFC history (six)
Fight of the Year (2012) vs. Jim Miller
Tied (Charles Oliveira) for second most finishes in UFC Lightweight division history (13)
 Tied (Diego Sanchez, Jim Miller and Justin Gaethje) for fifth most Fight of the Night bonuses in UFC history (7)
United States Kickboxing Association
USKBA U.S. Super Welterweight Championship (one time)
World Fighting League
WFL Grand Prix Champion
World MMA Awards
2012 Fight of the Year vs. Jamie Varner at UFC on Fox: Shogun vs. Vera
Massachusetts MMA outlets
2004 Massachusetts Fighter of the Year Honors

Personal life 
Lauzon is married to Katie, and they have two sons, Joey (born 2014) and Jacob (born 2017). Joey was diagnosed with stage 4S neuroblastoma a week after he was born, and was finally cleared as cancer free in early 2019.

Lauzon's moniker, 'J-Lau', was given by friends who he trained with when he was in high school. Lauzon did not fancy his nickname, as it is referenced to Jennifer Lopez, and would prefer his nickname to be 'Baby Joe' instead:

Mixed martial arts record

|-
|Win
|align=center|28–15
|Jonathan Pearce
|TKO (punches)
|UFC on ESPN: Reyes vs. Weidman 
|
|align=center|1
|align=center|1:33
|Boston, Massachusetts, United States
|
|-
|Loss
|align=center|27–15
|Chris Gruetzemacher
|TKO (corner stoppage)
|UFC 223
|
|align=center|2
|align=center|5:00
|Brooklyn, New York, United States
|
|-
|Loss
|align=center|27–14
|Clay Guida
|TKO (punches and elbows)
|UFC Fight Night: Poirier vs. Pettis
|
|align=center|1
|align=center|1:07
|Norfolk, Virginia, United States
|
|-
|Loss
|align=center|27–13
|Stevie Ray
|Decision (majority)
|UFC Fight Night: Swanson vs. Lobov
|
|align=center|3
|align=center|5:00
|Nashville, Tennessee, United States
|
|-
|Win
|align=center|27–12
|Marcin Held
|Decision (split)
|UFC Fight Night: Rodríguez vs. Penn
|
|align=center|3
|align=center|5:00
|Phoenix, Arizona, United States
| 
|-
|Loss
|align=center|26–12
|Jim Miller
|Decision (split)
|UFC on Fox: Maia vs. Condit
|
|align=center|3
|align=center|5:00
|Vancouver, British Columbia, Canada
|
|-
|Win
|align=center|26–11
|Diego Sanchez
|TKO (punches)
|UFC 200
|
|align=center|1
|align=center|1:26
|Las Vegas, Nevada, United States
|
|-
|Loss
|align=center|25–11
|Evan Dunham
|Decision (unanimous)
|The Ultimate Fighter: Team McGregor vs. Team Faber Finale
|
|align=center|3
|align=center|5:00
|Las Vegas, Nevada, United States
|  
|-
|Win
|align=center|25–10 
|Takanori Gomi
|TKO (punches)
|UFC on Fox: Dillashaw vs. Barão 2
|
|align=center|1
|align=center|2:37
|Chicago, Illinois, United States
|
|-
| Loss
| align=center| 24–10 
| Al Iaquinta
| TKO (punches)
| UFC 183
| 
| align=center|2
| align=center|3:34
| Las Vegas, Nevada, United States
| 
|-
| Win
| align=center| 24–9
| Michael Chiesa
| TKO (doctor stoppage) 
| UFC Fight Night: Jacare vs. Mousasi
| 
| align=center| 2
| align=center| 2:14
| Mashantucket, Connecticut, United States
| 
|-
| Win
| align=center| 23–9
| Mac Danzig
| Decision (unanimous)
| UFC on Fox: Johnson vs. Benavidez 2
| 
| align=center| 3
| align=center| 5:00
| Sacramento, California, United States
| 
|-
| Loss
| align=center| 22–9
| Michael Johnson
| Decision (unanimous)
| UFC Fight Night: Shogun vs. Sonnen
| 
| align=center| 3
| align=center| 5:00
| Boston, Massachusetts, United States
| 
|-
| Loss
| align=center| 22–8
| Jim Miller
| Decision (unanimous)
| UFC 155
| 
| align=center| 3
| align=center| 5:00
| Las Vegas, Nevada, United States
| 
|-
| Win
| align=center| 22–7
| Jamie Varner
| Submission (triangle choke)
| UFC on Fox: Shogun vs. Vera
| 
| align=center| 3
| align=center| 2:44
| Los Angeles, California, United States
| 
|-
| Loss
| align=center| 21–7
| Anthony Pettis
| KO (head kick and punches)
| UFC 144
| 
| align=center| 1
| align=center| 1:21
| Saitama, Japan
| 
|-
| Win
| align=center| 21–6
| Melvin Guillard
| Submission (rear-naked choke)
| UFC 136
| 
| align=center| 1
| align=center| 0:47
| Houston, Texas, United States
| 
|-
| Win
| align=center| 20–6
| Curt Warburton
| Submission (kimura)
| UFC Live: Kongo vs. Barry
| 
| align=center| 1
| align=center| 1:58
| Pittsburgh, Pennsylvania, United States
| 
|-
| Loss
| align=center| 19–6
| George Sotiropoulos
| Submission (kimura)
| UFC 123
| 
| align=center| 2
| align=center| 2:43
| Auburn Hills, Michigan, United States
| 
|-
| Win
| align=center| 19–5
| Gabe Ruediger
| Submission (armbar)
| UFC 118
| 
| align=center| 1
| align=center| 2:01
| Boston, Massachusetts, United States
| 
|-
| Loss
| align=center| 18–5
| Sam Stout
| Decision (unanimous)
| UFC 108
| 
| align=center| 3
| align=center| 5:00
| Las Vegas, Nevada, United States
| 
|-
| Win
| align=center| 18–4
| Jeremy Stephens
| Submission (armbar)
| UFC Fight Night: Lauzon vs. Stephens
| 
| align=center| 2
| align=center| 4:43
| Tampa, Florida, United States
| 
|-
| Win
| align=center| 17–4
| Kyle Bradley
| TKO (punches)
| UFC Fight Night: Diaz vs. Neer
| 
| align=center| 2
| align=center| 1:34
| Omaha, Nebraska, United States
| 
|-
| Loss
| align=center| 16–4
| Kenny Florian
| TKO (punches and elbows)
| UFC Fight Night: Florian vs. Lauzon
| 
| align=center| 2
| align=center| 3:28
| Broomfield, Colorado, United States
| 
|-
| Win
| align=center| 16–3
| Jason Reinhardt
| Submission (rear-naked choke)
| UFC 78
| 
| align=center| 1
| align=center| 1:14
| Newark, New Jersey, United States
| 
|-
| Win
| align=center| 15–3
| Brandon Melendez
| Submission (triangle choke)
| The Ultimate Fighter 5 Finale
| 
| align=center| 2
| align=center| 2:09
| Las Vegas, Nevada, United States
| 
|-
| Win
| align=center| 14–3
| Jens Pulver
| KO (punches)
| UFC 63
| 
| align=center| 1
| align=center| 0:48
| Anaheim, California, United States
| 
|-
| Win
| align=center| 13–3
| Douglas Brown
| Submission (armbar)
|rowspan=3| WFL 6: Real: No Fooling Around
|rowspan=3| 
| align=center| 1
| align=center| 1:47
|rowspan=3| Revere, Massachusetts, United States
| 
|-
| Win
| align=center| 12–3
| Zane Baker
| KO (slam)
| align=center| 1
| align=center| 3:39
| 
|-
| Win
| align=center| 11–3
| Adam Comfort
| Submission (achilles lock)
| align=center| 1
| align=center| 1:44
| 
|-
| Loss
| align=center| 10–3
| Raphael Assunção
| Submission (armbar)
| Absolute Fighting Championships 15
| 
| align=center| 2
| align=center| 4:37
| Fort Lauderdale, Florida, United States
| 
|-
| Win
| align=center| 10–2
| Antoine Skinner
| Submission (triangle choke)
| CZ 12: Night of Champions
| 
| align=center| 1
| align=center| 1:00
| Revere, Massachusetts, United States
| 
|-
| Loss
| align=center| 9–2
| Ivan Menjivar
| Submission (calf slicer)
| APEX: Undisputed
| 
| align=center| 1
| align=center| 3:39
| Montreal, Quebec, Canada
| 
|-
| Win
| align=center| 9–1
| Tim Honeycutt
| TKO (punches)
| Absolute Fighting Championships 13
| 
| align=center| 1
| align=center| 0:11
| Fort Lauderdale, Florida, United States
| 
|-
| Loss
| align=center| 8–1
| Jorge Masvidal
| TKO (punches)
| Absolute Fighting Championships 12
| 
| align=center| 2
| align=center| 3:57
| Fort Lauderdale, Florida, United States
| 
|-
| Win
| align=center| 8–0
| Joe Ahlert
| Submission (guillotine choke)
| Mass Destruction 19
| 
| align=center| 3
| align=center| 3:47
| Boston, Massachusetts, United States
|
|-
| Win
| align=center| 7–0
| Ryan Ciotoli
| Technical Submission (armbar)
| CZ 9: Hot Like Fire
| 
| align=center| 3
| align=center| 0:34
| Revere, Massachusetts, United States
|
|-
| Win
| align=center| 6–0
| Mike Brown
| Submission (rear-naked choke)
| CZ 8: Street Justice
| 
| align=center| 3
| align=center| 2:14
| Revere, Massachusetts, United States
|
|-
| Win
| align=center| 5–0
| Justin Blasich
| Submission (rear-naked choke)
| Mass Destruction 17
| 
| align=center| 1
| align=center| 1:02
| Boston, Massachusetts, United States
| 
|-
| Win
| align=center| 4–0
| Renat Myzabekov
| Submission (toe hold)
| CZ 7: Gravel Pit
| 
| align=center| 1
| align=center| 0:40
| Revere, Massachusetts, United States
| 
|-
| Win
| align=center| 3–0
| Kyle Sprouse
| Submission (heel hook)
| CZ 6: Rampage
| 
| align=center| 1
| align=center| 0:26
| Taunton, Massachusetts, United States
| 
|-
| Win
| align=center| 2–0
| Jerry Mosquea
| TKO (punches)
| MMA: Eruption
| 
| align=center| 1
| align=center| 2:37
| Lowell, Massachusetts, United States
| 
|-
| Win
| align=center| 1–0
| David Gilrein
| Submission (armbar)
| Mass Destruction 15
| 
| align=center| 1
| align=center| 3:42
| Boston, Massachusetts, United States
|
|-

Mixed martial arts exhibition record

|-
|Loss
|align=center|2–1
|Manvel Gamburyan
|Decision (unanimous)
|rowspan=3|The Ultimate Fighter 5
| (air date)
|align=center|3
|align=center|5:00
|rowspan=3|Las Vegas, Nevada, United States
|
|-
|Win
|align=center|2–0
|Cole Miller
|TKO (punches)
| (air date)
|align=center|2
|align=center|3:58
|
|-
|Win
|align=center|1–0
|Brian Geraghty
|Submission (rear-naked choke)
| (air date)
|align=center|1
|align=center|1:13
|

Submission grappling record 
{| class="wikitable sortable" style="font-size:80%; text-align:left;"
|-
| colspan=8 style="text-align:center;" | 1 Matches, 0 Wins, 1 Losses, 0 Draws
|-
!  Result
!  Rec.
!  Opponent
!  Method
!  text-center| Event
!  Date
!  Division
!  Location
|-
| Loss ||align=center|0-1||  Dillon Danis || Submission (D'Arce Choke) || rowspan=2| Metamoris 6|| rowspan=2|May 9, 2015 || Openweight ||rowspan=2|  Los Angeles, California, United States

See also
 List of current UFC fighters
 List of male mixed martial artists

References

External links

 Official site

Official UFC Profile
 

American male mixed martial artists
Mixed martial artists from Massachusetts
Lightweight mixed martial artists
Mixed martial artists utilizing boxing
Mixed martial artists utilizing Brazilian jiu-jitsu
Living people
1984 births
Sportspeople from Brockton, Massachusetts
People from East Bridgewater, Massachusetts
Wentworth Institute of Technology alumni
American practitioners of Brazilian jiu-jitsu
People awarded a black belt in Brazilian jiu-jitsu
Ultimate Fighting Championship male fighters
Sportspeople from Plymouth County, Massachusetts